The Commissioners in Lunacy for Ireland or Lunacy Commission for Ireland were a public body established by the Lunacy (Ireland) Act 1821 to oversee asylums and the welfare of mentally ill people in Ireland.

Establishment
The Board of Commissioners in Lunacy for Ireland, more strictly known as the "Commission of General Control and Correspondence", was established in 1821 by the Lunacy (Ireland) Act 1821. The commission consisted of four doctors and four lay members. It was responsible for designating the districts to be served by the asylums, selecting the locations and approving the designs.

Asylums commissioned
The Eglinton Asylum in Cork and the Richmond Asylum in Dublin existed at the time the legislation was enacted and were incorporated into the new district asylum system as the Cork Asylum and the Dublin Asylum in 1830 and 1845 respectively. The new asylums that were commissioned under the auspices of the Commissioners in Lunacy for Ireland included:

 Antrim Asylum, 1899
 Armagh Asylum, 1825
 Connacht Asylum, 1833
 Belfast Asylum, 1829
 Carlow Asylum, 1832
 Castlebar Asylum, 1866
 Clonmel Asylum, 1835
 Donegal Asylum, 1866
 Down Asylum, 1869
 Ennis Asylum, 1868
 Enniscorthy Asylum, 1868
 Killarney Asylum, 1852
 Kilkenny Asylum, 1852
 Limerick Asylum, 1827
 Londonderry Asylum, 1829
 Maryborough Asylum, 1833
 Monaghan Asylum, 1869
 Mullingar Asylum 1855
 Omagh Asylum, 1853
 Portrane Asylum, 1903
 Sligo Asylum, 1855
 Waterford Asylum, 1835

See also
Commissioners in Lunacy (for England and Wales)
Commissioners in Lunacy for Scotland

References

Mental health legal history of the United Kingdom
Defunct public bodies of the United Kingdom